The Ginn Championship at Hammock Beach was a golf tournament on the Champions Tour from 2007 to 2008. It was played for the first time in 2007 in Palm Coast, Florida at the Ocean Course at Ginn Hammock Beach Resort (formerly the Ocean Hammock Golf Club).

The purse for the 2008 tournament was US$2,500,000, with $375,000 going to the winner.

On January 29, 2009, Ginn Resorts announced that they were discontinuing their sponsorship of the Ginn Championship at Hammock Beach, the Ginn Open on the LPGA Tour and the Ginn sur Mer Classic on the PGA Tour.

Winners
Ginn Championship Hammock Beach Resort
2008 Bernhard Langer
2007 Keith Fergus

Source:

References

External links
Announcement
Official website
PGATOUR.com tournament website
Ocean Hammock Resort website

Former PGA Tour Champions events
Golf in Florida
Palm Coast, Florida
Recurring sporting events established in 2007
Recurring sporting events disestablished in 2008
2007 establishments in Florida
2008 disestablishments in Florida